The UCI Track Cycling World Ranking is a track cycling ranking system based upon the results in all men's and women's UCI-sanctioned races over a twelve-month period. The ranking includes an individual and a nations ranking and includes the disciplines: individual pursuit, points race, scratch, sprint, time trial, keirin, omnium (since 2010–11), team pursuit, team sprint and madison (men only).

2008–2009

Source

2009–2010

Source

2010–2011

Source

2011–1212

Source

2012–2013

Source

2013–2014

Source

2014–2015

Source

2015–2016

Source

2016–2017

Source

See also

 UCI Women's Road World Rankings (1994–2017)
 UCI Road World Rankings (1984–2004)

References

External links